U.S.A. for M.O.D. is the debut full-length studio album from American crossover thrash band, M.O.D. It was released in 1987 on Megaforce Records. In 1988, the band subsequently released the EP, Surfin' M.O.D..

Album name
While Stormtroopers of Death were recording their debut album, Speak English or Die, tentative plans were made for a follow-up titled U.S.A. for S.O.D.. When the band did not release an immediate follow-up, M.O.D. used the title instead.

Track listing
All songs written by M.O.D., unless otherwise stated

Credits

M.O.D.
 Billy Milano – vocals
 Tim McMurtrie – guitar
 Ken Ballone – bass
 Keith Davis – drums

Others
 Scott Ian – acoustic guitar, backing vocals
 Recorded at Pyramid Sound, Ithaca, New York, USA
 Produced by Alex Perialas and Scott Ian
 Engineered by Alex Perialas
 Executive produced by Jon Zazula
 Cover art by Anthony Ferrara

References

External links
MOD and SOD official fansite

1987 debut albums
M.O.D. albums
Albums produced by Alex Perialas
Megaforce Records albums